Bakersfield Municipal Airport  is a city-owned public-use airport located three nautical miles (6 km) south of the central business district of Bakersfield, a city in Kern County, California, United States. The airport is mostly used for general aviation.

History 
During World War II the airfield was used by the United States Army Air Forces, as Bakersfield Army Air Field, Air Transport Command as a sub-base of Hammer Field. Early US jet fighters, Bell P-59 Airacomet, were operating from the Airport in 1943.

Facilities and aircraft 
It has one runway designated 16/34 with an asphalt surface measuring 4,000 by 75 feet (1,219 x 23 m).

For the 12-month period ending April 13, 2009, the airport had 25,000 general aviation aircraft operations, an average of 68 per day. At that time there were 82 aircraft based at this airport: 90% single-engine and 10% multi-engine.

See also
 California World War II Army Airfields
 List of airports in Kern County, California

References

External links 
 Aerial image as of 1 June 1994 from USGS The National Map
 

Airports in Bakersfield, California
San Joaquin Valley
Airfields of the United States Army Air Forces in California
Airfields of the United States Army Air Forces Air Transport Command in North America